Marghesh or Marghash may refer to:
 Marghesh, Gonabad
 Marghesh, Mashhad